The Tango Lesson is a 1997 drama film written and directed by Sally Potter. It is a semi-autobiographical film starring Potter and Pablo Verón, about Argentinian Tango.

The film, a co-production of Argentina, France, Germany, Netherlands and the United Kingdom, was produced by Christopher Sheppard in Britain and Oscar Kramer in Argentina, and was shot mostly in black and white in Paris and Buenos Aires. The soundtrack includes original recordings of Carlos Gardel's Mi Buenos Aires querido and Ástor Piazzolla's Libertango, two of the most iconic tangos in the history of the genre. It also includes an original song written and sung by Potter.

Synopsis
Sally, a filmmaker and screenwriter suffering from writer's block, is dissatisfied with her film project, a murder mystery called Rage, which features the fashion industry. Taking a break, she travels to Paris, where she sees the dancer Pablo (Pablo Verón) performing tango. She becomes obsessed with the dance and offers Pablo a part in her film in exchange for dance lessons. The two become deeply involved as dancers and as lovers. Their emotional intimacy threatens the success of their dancing together. The film explores the conflict between the woman dancer accepting the man's lead in the dance, while the man must accept the woman's lead in the film. It is a love story and a showcase for Verón's dancing.

Cast
 Sally Potter as Sally
 Pablo Verón as Pablo
 Morgane Maugran as Red Model
 Géraldine Maillet as Yellow Model
 Katerina Mechera as Blue Model
 David Toole as Fashion Designer
 George Yiasoumi as Photographer
 Michele Parent as Seamstress
 Claudine Mavros as Seamstress
 Monique Couturier as Seamstress
 Matthew Hawkins as Bodyguard
 Simon Worgan as Bodyguard
 Carolina Iotti as Pablo's partner
 Zobeida as Pablo's Friend
 Orazio Massaro as Pablo's Friend
 Gustavo Naveira as Gustavo
 Fabián Salas as Fabian
 Carlos Copello as Carlos
 María Noel as Film Executive
 Gregory Dayton as Film Executive

Distribution
The film was first presented at the Venice Film Festival in Italy on 29 August 1997. One week later it was screened at the Toronto International Film Festival in Canada on 8 September 1997. The picture screened at various film festivals, including: the Mar del Plata Film Festival, Argentina; the Reykjavik Film Festival, Iceland; the Istanbul Film Festival, Turkey; and others.

Film soundtrack
Milonga Triste composed by Sebastián Piana and Homero Manzi, performed by Hugo Díaz y su Conjunto, recorded in Buenos Aires in 1972.
Now composed by Sally Potter & Fred Frith, sung by Sally Potter, recorded in Paris 1996.
Quejas de bandoneón composed by Juan de Dios Filiberto, performed by Aníbal Troilo y su Orquesta típica, recorded in Buenos Aires in 1958.
Red, yellow, blue composed by Sally Potter & Fred Frith, recorded in Paris in 1996.
Mi Buenos Aires querido composed by Carlos Gardel and Alfredo Le Pera, sung by Carlos Gardel, recorded in New York in 1934.
El flete composed by Gerónimo Gradito and Vicente Greco, performed by Juan D'Arienzo y su Orquesta Típica, recorded in Buenos Aires in 1936.
Rage composed by Sally Potter & Fred Frith, sung by Sally Potter, recorded in Paris in 1996.
Zum composed by Astor Piazzolla, performed by Osvaldo Pugliese y su Orquesta, recorded in Buenos Aires in 1973.
Amor y celos composed by Miguel Padula & Alfredo F. Roldán, performed by Juan D'Arienzo y su Orquesta Típica, recorded in Buenos Aires in 1936.
Doyna composed by Frank London, David Licht & David Krakauer, performed by The Klezmatics, recorded in New York in 1994.
Danse de cuisine composed by Sally Potter & Fred Frith, sung by Sally Potter, recorded in Paris in 1996.
Pensalo bien composed by Juan Jose Visiglio, Nola Lopez & Julio Alberto, sung by Alberto Echague with the Juan D'Arienzo y su Orquesta Típica, recorded in Buenos Aires in 1938.
La yumba composed by Osvaldo Pugliese, performed by Osvaldo Pugliese y su Orquesta, recorded in Buenos Aires in 1946.
Jacob and the angel composed by Sally Potter & Fred Frith, sung by Sally Potter, recorded in Paris in 1996.
Milonga de mis amores composed by Pedro B. Laurenz & José Maria Contursi, performed by Juan D'Arienzo y su Orquesta Típica, recorded in Buenos Aires in 1970.
Gallo ciego, composed by Agustín Bardi, performed by Osvaldo Pugliese y su Orquesta, recorded in Buenos Aires in 1959.
Libertango composed by Astor Piazzolla, performed by Astor Piazzolla & orchestra, recorded in Milan in 1974.
Bahia Blanca composed by Carlos di Sarli, performed by Carlos Di Sarli y su Orquesta Típica, recorded in Buenos Aires in 1958.
I am you, composed by Sebastian Piana & Homero Manzi with English lyrics by Sally Potter, sung by Sally Potter with Yo-Yo Ma (cello), Nestor E. Marconi (bandoneon), Antonio Agri (violin), Leonardo D. Marconi (piano) & Horacio Malvicino (guitar), recorded in Buenos Aires in 1997.
Libertango (reprise) composed by Astor Piazzolla, performed by Yo-Yo Ma (cello), Antonio Agri (violin), Nestor E. Marconi (bandoneon), Horacio Malvicino (guitar).

Exhibition dates
 Argentina: 20 November 1997
 France: 8 April 1998
 Germany: 9 October 1997
 Netherlands: 15 January 1998
 United Kingdom: 28 November 1997
 United States: 14 November 1997

Critical reception
New York Times film critic, Janet Maslin, thought the film was rather simple, and wrote,
"Stiffly playing a filmmaker with a growing passion for the tango, [Sally Potter] makes this a handsome, dryly meticulous film with no real fire anywhere beyond its supple dance scenes. The lessons are numbered and cataloged with an obsessive care like that of Peter Greenaway, but this material has little of his corresponding complexity."

Chicago Sun-Times film critic Roger Ebert discussed in his review the film's major goal, writing, "Most dances are for people who are falling in love. The tango is a dance for those who have survived it, and are still a little angry about having their hearts so mishandled. The Tango Lesson is a movie for people who understand that difference."

Edward Guthmann, San Francisco Chronicle staff critic, lauded the film and the courage of director Potter, and wrote,
"British director Sally Potter stuck her neck out when she made The Tango Lesson, a fictionalized account of her relationship with Argentine tango master Pablo Veron...Potter takes what seemed like a recipe for embarrassment and excess and delivers a film that's sweet and understated and devoid of diva posturing...[the film is] smoothly directed, nicely written and falters only in the performance that Potter was able to squeeze out of herself while performing her multiple tasks."Yet, Guthmann says Potter should have cast another actor in her role. He adds,
"It's too bad, then, that Potter couldn't have figured out a way to use another actress to play herself. She often looks worn out, which makes sense given her offscreen responsibilities but works against her tale of courtship, infatuation and the emotional sparks that fly between two gifted, bullheaded artists."

Awards
Wins
 Mar del Plata Film Festival: Best Film, Sally Potter; 1997.
 National Board of Review: Special Recognition, for excellence in filmmaking; 1997.
 American Choreography Awards: American Choreography Award Outstanding Achievement in Feature Film, Pablo Verón; 1998.
Nominations
 British Academy of Film and Television Arts: BAFTA Film Award; Best Film not in the English Language; 1998.

References

External links
  Official Web-site
 
 La lección de tango at the cinenacional.com 
 

1997 films
Argentine black-and-white films
British black-and-white films
Dutch black-and-white films
German black-and-white films
French black-and-white films
Films directed by Sally Potter
French romantic drama films
1997 romantic drama films
Tango films
British romantic drama films
Dutch romantic drama films
German romantic drama films
Argentine romantic drama films
Films set in Buenos Aires
Films shot in Buenos Aires
1990s Spanish-language films
1990s French-language films
1990s English-language films
English-language Argentine films
English-language Dutch films
English-language French films
English-language German films
Sony Pictures Classics films
1990s British films
1990s French films
1990s German films